Otmar Freiherr von Verschuer (16 July 1896 – 8 August 1969) was a German-Dutch human biologist and geneticist, who was the Professor of Human Genetics at the University of Münster until he retired in 1965. A member of the Dutch noble Verschuer family, his title Freiherr is often translated as baron.

He was regarded as a pioneer in the twin methodology of genetics research and in the study of the inheritance of diseases and anomalies. A Nazi-affiliated eugenicist with an interest in racial hygiene, he was an advocate of compulsory sterilization programs in the first half of the 20th century. Among his many students was Josef Mengele, a war criminal who directed experiments on children at Auschwitz.

He successfully redefined himself as a geneticist in the postwar era. During the 1950s and 1960s, he was known for research on the effects of nuclear radiation on humans and for his warnings against the possibility of creating "scientifically improved" human beings offered by genetic science.

Verschuer was the director of the Institute for Genetic Biology and Racial Hygiene from 1935 to 1942 and director of the Kaiser Wilhelm Institute of Anthropology, Human Heredity, and Eugenics (KWI-A) from 1942 to 1948. From 1951 to 1965, he was Professor of Human Genetics at the University of Münster, where he also served as Dean of the Faculty of Medicine. At Münster, he established one of the largest centers of genetics research in West Germany, and remained one of the world's most prominent genetics researchers until his death. He became Professor Emeritus in 1965; he received numerous memberships in learned societies. In 1952 he was elected President of the German Anthropological Association. His son Helmut von Verschuer was a high-ranking official of the European Commission.

Family
Otmar von Verschuer was born into a noble family. From birth he held the title of Freiherr (baron), a title that had been granted to several family branches by the Holy Roman Emperor, the Dutch king, and the elector of Hesse. He was mainly of Dutch, German, Estonian/Baltic German, and Swedish descent, and had distant Scottish ancestry. His father Hans von Verschuer was a businessman who owned a mining company, while his mother Charlotte née von Arnold was originally from Estonia; her family was ennobled in Russia in the mid-19th century and was partially resident in Sweden. He was a descendant of the House of Stuart through his 6th great grandmother Brita Stuart, a Swedish noblewoman of Scottish royal descent.

Otmar von Verschuer was the father of Helmut Freiherr von Verschuer (also known as Helmut van Verschuer), a high-ranking official of the European Commission, and the grandfather of the Belgian-German actor, Leopold Freiherr von Verschuer (born 1961 in Brussels).

Early career
Verschuer served in the First World War and had been promoted to first lieutenant by 1918. From 1919, he studied medicine at the University of Marburg. He earned a doctorate in medicine at LMU in 1923 and a habilitation at the University of Tübingen in 1927. In 1927, he became head of department for human genetics at the Kaiser Wilhelm Institute of Anthropology, Human Heredity, and Eugenics.

Nazi era 

In 1935, Verschuer became a member of the congregation of the anti-Nazi pastor Otto Fricke, a leading member of the Confessing Church. He also maintained a close friendship with his relative, Adam von Trott zu Solz, a leading resistance figure. Despite his proximity to the Confessing Church, he joined the Nazi Party in 1940, although he was not actively involved with politics.

In the late stages of the Second World War, Verschuer directly or indirectly started to use research material obtained in the Auschwitz concentration camp, mainly through his former student Josef Mengele, who served there as a camp physician.

Verschuer was never tried for war crimes despite many indications that not only was he fully cognisant of Mengele's work at Auschwitz, but even encouraged and collaborated with Mengele. In a report to the German Research Council (Deutsche Forschungsgemeinschaft; DFG) from 1944, Verschuer talked about Mengele's assistance in supplying the KWI-A with some "scientific materials" from Auschwitz:

My assistant, Dr. Mengele (M.D., Ph.D.) has joined me in this branch of research. He is presently employed as Hauptsturmführer and camp physician in the concentration camp at Auschwitz. Anthropological investigations on the most diverse racial groups of this concentration camp are being carried out with permission of the SS Reichsführer [Himmler]; the blood samples are being sent to my laboratory for analysis.

Verschuer wrote in the report that the war conditions had made it difficult for the KWI-A to procure "twin materials" for study, and that Mengele's unique position at Auschwitz offered a special opportunity in this respect. In the summer of 1944, Mengele and his Jewish slave assistant Dr. Miklós Nyiszli sent other "scientific materials" to the KWI-A, including the bodies of murdered Roma, internal organs of dead children, skeletons of two murdered Jews, and blood samples of twins infected by Mengele with typhus.

He was accepted during the war as a member of the American Eugenics Society, a position he kept until his death.

Post-war career
As the war was drawing to a close in 1945, Verschuer moved the files of the KWI-A into the Western part of Germany, hoping for a more favorable response from the advancing Allied armies than from the advancing Soviet Army. In late 1945 or early 1946, he petitioned the mayor of Frankfurt to allow him to reestablish the KWI-A. However, the commission in charge of rebuilding the Kaiser Wilhelm Gesellschaft decreed that "Verschuer should be considered not as a collaborator, but one of the most dangerous Nazi activists of the Third Reich." The KWI-A was not reestablished.

In 1951, Verschuer was awarded the prestigious professorship of human genetics at the University of Münster, where he established one of the largest centers of genetics research in West Germany. Like many "racial hygienists" of the Nazi period, and many American eugenicists, Verschuer was successful in redefining himself as a genetics researcher after the war, and avoided the taint of his work with Nazi eugenics. Many of his wartime students were similarly appointed to top positions in universities of Erlangen, Frankfurt, Düsseldorf, and Münster.

In his denazification hearing, Verschuer was deemed to be a Nazi fellow traveler (Mitläufer, a relatively mild categorization meaning someone who was neither a supporter or member of the regime nor an active opponent), and fined . He was never prosecuted for his research activities during the war. Leo Alexander who investigated the case concluded that no solid evidence could be found, and considered it likely that Verschuer had destroyed any possibly incriminating material.

During the 1950s and 1960s, Verschuer led major research projects on the effects of nuclear radiation on humans. Deeply religious, he also concerned himself with questions of Christian ethics, and argued that eugenics must be based on human dignity and love for mankind; according to historian Sheila F. Weiss he "turned his back on" Nazi beliefs. In the 1960s he warned against human geneticists trying to create "scientifically improved" human beings. But he was among the founders of The Mankind Quarterly, a journal promoting scientific racism.

Verschuer died in 1969 in a car accident.

Honours
 1934: Fellow of the Academy of Sciences Leopoldina
 1943: Fellow of the Prussian Academy of Sciences
 1949: Fellow of the Akademie der Wissenschaften und der Literatur
 1949: Corresponding member of the American Society of Human Genetics
 1953: Honorary member of the Italian Society of Medical Genetics
 1955: Honorary member of the Anthropological Society of Vienna
 1956: Honorary member of the Japanese Society of Human Genetics
 1959: Corresponding member of the Austrian Academy of Sciences

Bibliography
Erbpathologie (Hereditary pathology, 1934).
Erbbiologie als Unterlage der Bevölkerungspolitik (Hereditary biology as a basis for the population policy). First published in 1933, re-published and modified in 1936.
Rassenhygiene als Wissenschaft und Staatsaufgabe (Racial hygiene as Science and State function, 1936).
Leitfaden der Rassenhygiene (Textbook of Racial hygiene, 1944).
Eugenik. Kommende Generationen in der Sicht der Genetik (Eugenics: Coming Generations in the view of Genetics, 1966).

See also 
Nazi eugenics
Heinrich Gross

Notes

References

Other sources
 {{citation | editor1-last=Westermann | editor1-first=Stefanie | editor2-last=Kühl | editor2-first=Richard | editor3-last=Gross | editor3-first=Dominik | title=Medizin und Nationalsozialismus vol. 1: Medizin im Dienst der "Erbgesundheit": Beiträge zur Geschichte der Eugenik und "Rassenhygiene" (English: Medicine and National Socialism, Vol. 1: Medicine at work, the "hereditary health": Contribution to history of Eugenics and "race hygiene")| year=2009 | publisher=LIT Verlag Münster| isbn=978-3643104786| url =https://books.google.com/books?id=h54Gsl6JBT8C&pg=PA78 }}
 Sheila Faith Weiss: After the Fall. Political Whitewashing, Professional Posturing, and personal Refashioning in the Postwar Career of Otmar Freiherr von Verschuer. Isis, Vol. 101 (2010), 722–758.
 Peter Degen, "Racial Hygienist Otmar von Verschuer, the Confessing Church, and comparative reflections on postwar rehabilitation," pp. 155–65 in Jing Bao Nie, Japan´s Medical Wartime Atrocities (London: Routledge&Kegan, 2010)
 Robert N. Proctor, Racial Hygiene: Medicine under the Nazis, Cambridge, MA: Harvard University Press, 1988.
 Paul Weindling, "'Tales from Nuremberg': The Kaiser Wilhelm Institute for Anthropology and Allied medical war crimes policy," in Geschichte der Kaiser-Wilhelm-Gesellschaft im Nationalsozialismus: Bestandaufnahme und Perspektiven der Forschung, ed. Doris Kaufmann, v.2 (Goettingen: Wallstein, 2000), 635–652.
 Katrin Weigmann: "In the name of science. The role of biologists in Nazi atrocities: lessons for today's scientists" in EMBO Reports v.2 #10 (2001), 871–875.
 Eric Ehrenreich, "Otmar von Verschuer and the 'Scientific' Legitimization of Nazi Anti-Jewish Policy," Holocaust and Genocide Studies 2007 21(1):55–72

 External links 
 
 "In the name of science" EMBO Reports article about KWI scientists' wartime atrocities, with images of Verschuer
 "Skeletons in the Closet of German Science" Deutsche Welle'' article on Verschuer's research connection to Mengele

1896 births
1969 deaths
People from Hersfeld-Rotenburg
People from Hesse-Nassau
German eugenicists
German Army personnel of World War I
Barons of Germany
Physicians in the Nazi Party
University of Marburg alumni
Academic staff of Goethe University Frankfurt
Academic staff of the University of Münster
Prussian Army personnel
Road incident deaths in Germany
20th-century German writers
German people of Dutch descent
German people of Swedish descent
German people of Scottish descent
Kapp Putsch participants
20th-century German male writers
Max Planck Institute directors